Toston may refer to:

 Keith Toston (born 1987), footballer
 Roosevelt Toston, journalist
 Toston, Montana
 Toston Bridge
 Toston Dam
 Tostones
 Tostón Lighthouse